Gore is a rural Canadian community in central Hants County, Nova Scotia.  It is located just 25 minutes from Elmsdale; 30 minutes from Halifax Stanfield International Airport; and 45 minutes from Truro. It was named after Sir Charles Stephen Gore. (Gore was the Aide-de-camp of Major General James Kempt, after whom Kempt, Nova Scotia is named.) The community was settled primarily by the 84th Regiment of Foot (Royal Highland Emigrants).

Gore is a farming community near the Rawdon Hills, and is home to Environment Canada's Doppler weather radar station "XGO". It was once home to the East Hants Courthouse which conducted business of the East Hants Municipality and its council. The courthouse stood on the community's Courthouse Hill for 90 years until a fire destroyed it on July 22, 1956. The courthouse was never rebuilt but today there is a memorial that marks the place where it once stood. The site, located on Courthouse Hill Road, is renowned as a scenic viewing point. On a clear day parts of five Nova Scotia counties, from west to east Kings, Cumberland, Colchester, Pictou, as well as Hants, can be seen from marked stones placed in the ground. Gorgeous wildblueberry fields and farmland surround the monument.

In the Gore, there is access to a large amount of mountain bike trails for any level of rider through the woods and across farmland known as Empire Trails. At the same location, there is agriculture tourism and outdoor adventure event grounds known as NovaStrong. Also, the East Gore Eco Airpark for small hobby planes

References

Gore on Nsplacenames.ca

Communities in Hants County, Nova Scotia